The 1952 Rice Owls football team represented Rice University during the 1952 college football season. The Owls were led by 13th-year head coach Jess Neely and played their home games at  Rice Stadium in Houston, Texas. The team competed as members of the Southwest Conference, finishing in second.

Schedule

References

Rice
Rice Owls football seasons
Rice Owls football